Saucy Haulage Ballads is an extended play CD released by the Birkenhead-based British group Half Man Half Biscuit in August 2003. A reviewer in Stylus Magazine remarked: "Saucy Haulage Ballads may only be a six-track EP, but it contains more ideas, insight and moments than most bands could manage in an entire career."

According to English writer Julie Burchill, the lyrics of "Blood on the Quad" have a "pleasing whiff" of the finale of Lindsay Anderson's 1968 film if.....

Track listing

Notes 
 "Jarg" is a Merseyside slang word meaning "fake", sometimes applied to knock-off goods.
 Armani is an Italian fashion house.
 "On Finding the Studio Banjo" is a reworking of Half Man Half Biscuit's 1986 song "The Trumpton Riots", in a bluegrass style with banjo accompaniment.
 A quad is a courtyard, often at one of the older English universities.
 The title "I Went to a Wedding..." parodies that of the 1952 song "I Went to Your Wedding".

References

External links
  The oldest-established Half Man Half Biscuit fansite
  The Half Man Half Biscuit Lyrics Project

Half Man Half Biscuit albums
2003 EPs

id:Half Man Half Biscuit